Roy Wagner (October 2, 1938 – September 10, 2018) was an American cultural anthropologist who specialized in symbolic anthropology.

Background
Wagner received a B.A. in Medieval History from Harvard University (1961), and a Ph.D. in anthropology from the University of Chicago (1966), where he studied under David M. Schneider. He taught at Southern Illinois University and Northwestern University before accepting the chairmanship of the Department of Anthropology at the University of Virginia, where he taught until his death. He resided in Charlottesville, Virginia.

Contributions
Wagner was one of the world's most influential anthropologists. He first conducted fieldwork among the Daribi of Karimui, in the Simbu Province of Papua New Guinea, as well as the Usen Barok of New Ireland. He was influential in creating the genre known as the New Melanesian Ethnography, which emphasizes creativity and innovation in cultures and how they understand the world.

His book The Invention of Culture (1975; 1981) is considered a classic of ethnography and theory, and has been translated into Japanese, Portuguese, Italian and French. His concepts of symbolic obviation, figure-ground reversal, analogic kinship, holography and fractality of personhood have been critical in the development of anthropological theory in the last few decades. Anthropologists influenced by Wagner include Marilyn Strathern, Jadran Mimica, James Weiner, and Eduardo Viveiros de Castro.

Major publications
 The Curse of Souw; Principles of Daribi Clan Definition and Alliance in New Guinea. Chicago: University of Chicago Press, 1967.
 Habu; The Innovation of Meaning in Daribi Religion. Chicago: University of Chicago Press, 1972.
 Lethal Speech: Daribi Myth As Symbolic Obviation. Ithaca, N.Y.: Cornell University Press, 1978.
 The Invention of Culture. Chicago: University of Chicago Press, [1975] 1981.
 Asiwinarong: Ethos, Image, and Social Power Among the Usen Barok of New Ireland. Princeton, N.J.: Princeton University Press, 1986.
 Symbols That Stand for Themselves. Chicago: University of Chicago Press, 1986.
 An Anthropology of the Subject: Holographic Worldview in New Guinea and Its Meaning and Significance for the World of Anthropology. Berkeley: University of California Press, 2001.
 Coyote Anthropology. Lincoln [Neb.]: University of Nebraska Press, 2010.

Articles and book chapters
 1977 - “Scientific and Indigenous Papuan Conceptualizations of the Innate”, in Bayliss-Smith, Timothy e Feachem, Richard (ed.), Subsistence and Survival (New York: Academic Press)

Works on Wagner
 Seção Temática: Seminário de Raposa, pensando com Roy Wagner. Ilha Revista de Antropologia. 12(1): 1–160.  
 "Reinventing the Invention of Culture" in Social Analysis. The International Journal of Cultural and Social Practice. Vol. 46, No. 1, Spring 2002. Edited by David Murray and Joel Robbins
 "The Double-Bind in the Obviation: The Sufficiency of Daribi Women and Bateson's 'Schizophrenic Mother'" by Elizabeth Stassinos given as an AAA paper at the George W. Stocking Jr. Symposium December 2, 2009 Organized by Andrew and Harriet Lyons, Discussants Herb Lewis and Kathy Fine. (Originally titled: "Obviating Roy Wagner: The Pidik of Science Fiction")
 John M. Ingham Simplicity and complexity in anthropology. On the Horizon 2007 Volume: 15  Issue:  1  Page:  7 - 14
 "Roy Wagner: Symbolic Anthropology and the fate of the New Melanesian Ethnography." Session organizers: Sandra Bamford, Joel Robbins, Justin Shaffner and James Weiner. Conference for the European Society for Oceanists (Verona, 2008).

External links
Personal page at the University of Virginia
interviewed by Alan Macfarlane 9th June 2008 (video)
Official obituary in The Daily Progress

Cultural anthropologists
University of Chicago alumni
Harvard College alumni
Northwestern University faculty
Southern Illinois University faculty
University of Virginia faculty
2018 deaths
1938 births
American anthropologists